BP Shipping is the maritime arm of British headquartered global oil company, BP. The unit covers the marine transport, logistics and insurance  requirements of all BP's global activities.

Formed in 1956 as BP Tanker Company Ltd, its roots go back to the British Tanker Company, which was formed to carry products for the Anglo-Persian Oil Company. It is hence the oldest continuous business unit in the BP group. The company changed its name to BP Shipping in 1981 to encompass its marine insurance activities, and in 2006 transported 251.7 million tonnes of crude and products, representing around 5% of the world's sea borne oil movements

Origins

British Tanker Company

Having initially employed independent contractors to carry its oil from Persia (now Iran) back to Europe and into India, in April 1915 the Anglo-Persian Oil Company (APOC) set up the British Tanker Company Limited (BTC) in April 1915, with an initial capital of £100,000. The BTC placed orders with two Tyne based shipbuilders, Armstrong Whitworth and Swan Hunter, for a total of 7 steam-powered oil tankers.

The BTC's first tanker was the 3,663 gross tonnage British Emperor, launched in 1916. The names of all the first seven ships bore the prefix "British", and all future additions to the fleet have followed the same naming convention. The 60th ship was the new flagship, the 6,998 gross tonnage British Aviator, BTC's first diesel engined oil tanker, and was at that time the most powerful single-screw motor ship in the world.

Through steadying of relationships with the Shah of Iran, APOC managed to strengthen its position within the industry during the Great Depression. With the outbreak of World War II in 1939, the British government chartered the BTC's whole fleet of 93 vessels, to transport fuel for its armed forces. The fleet lost 41 ships sunk during the war, with two others so badly damaged they could only be used as storage hulks.

BP Tanker Company
In November 1954, APOC renamed itself the British Petroleum Company, and in 1955 the BTC became the BP Tanker Company (BPTC). A significant development of the tanker fleet was seen in the building of the British Admiral, the first 100,000 dwt tanker built in Europe and launched at Barrow-in-Furness in 1965 by Elizabeth II.

In 1981 the company was renamed BP Shipping Ltd to reflect its changing role in managing the tanker fleet.

Operations
Today, while BP Shipping remains responsible within the group for all water-born logistics, much of its fleet capacity is gained through hiring other operators vessels. The result is that it is also responsible for marine assurance on everything that is sited within or floats on water.

Employing 2,800 people based mainly in London, Singapore and Chicago, at the end of 2006 BP Shipping managed:
57 vessels - four Very Large Crude Carriers (VLCCs), one North Sea shuttle tanker, 42 medium size crude and product carriers, seven liquefied natural gas (LNG) carriers and three new liquefied petroleum gas (LPG) carriers
24 regional vessels, including coasters
100 hydrocarbon-carrying vessels above 600 deadweight tonnes on time charter

Resulting in:
The shipping of 270 million tonnes of cargo volume
7,000 voyages, of which at any time 450-500 cargoes are "on the water"
On average two thirds of shipments are made by seagoing tankers, the rest via inland and harbour barges

The marine insurance activity covers 800-900 miscellaneous craft such as tugs, crew boats, barges and seismic vessels used in support of BP group business around the world. All are vetted, with policy being that BP Shipping considers a vessel to be unacceptable unless positively identified otherwise. Of the 4,700 inspections in 2006, half resulted in an initial rejection.

Other marine holdings include:
BP Shipcare: a lay-up facility located in East Malaysia
Alaska Tanker Company: minority shareholding in four purpose-built ships of 110,693 GT retained on time charter to transport crude oil from Alaska to US west coast  ports.  The ships are Alaskan Legend, Alaskan Explorer, Alaskan Frontier and Alaskan Navigator.
China LNG Shipping: 40% shareholding in ship management service to LNG carriers serving the Guangdong LNG terminal

Fleet

Retired ships

Active ships

References

External links
BP Shipping

British companies established in 1915
Transport companies established in 1915
BP subsidiaries
Shipping companies of England
Tanker shipping companies
Marine insurance companies
 
Insurance companies of the United Kingdom